HMBS Bahamas (P-60), along with sister ship , is a 198 foot Offshore Patrol Vessel delivered to the Royal Bahamas Defence Force on 12 January 1999. Both vessels were built by Moss Point Marine of Escatawpa, Mississippi (now VT Halter Marine) to a design by Vosper International Ltd, Naval Architects and Designers, Glasgow, UK. Bahamas serves the RBDF by patrolling Bahamian waters in anti-poaching and illegal immigration control missions, notably interdicting Haitian vessels, as well as drug enforcement missions in cooperation with the United States Coast Guard and Drug Enforcement Administration as part of Operation Bahamas, Turks and Caicos (OPBAT).

Two small Rigid Hull Inflatable Boats, 4 .50 Caliber M2 machine guns mounted aft and at mid-ship, and a larger 25mm bow-mounted automatic cannon provide flexible capabilities in the face of different contingencies. A full galley, sick-bay and living quarters allow Bahamas to fulfill longer duration missions than many of the RBDF's other smaller vessels.

The comparatively large size of Bahamas excludes her from use of the RBDF's primary facility at Coral Harbour on New Providence's west coast, so the vessel is based at Prince George Wharf in Nassau Harbour.

During 2016 Bahamas has been receiving a major refit at a local Bahamian yard, with the assistance of the Dutch Damen Group.

References

Further Information 
 Extensive Photo Gallery
 Haitian Vessel Interdiction in Cooperation with USCGC Reliance

Naval ships of the Bahamas
Bahamas
1999 ships